Kappa Lambda Psi is a local sorority founded on Monday, April 28, 1980, at Glassboro State College (now Rowan University). The Sorority has installed five chapters, but one is active. The Delta Chapter at Marist College in Poughkeepsie, NY, founded in October 1989.  The sorority was the first Greek Letter Organization on Marist College's campus.

Founding of the Delta chapter
Kappa Lambda Psi was founded by 28 women who had the hopes of creating the 27th national sorority to join the National Panhellenic Conference (NPC) and the brothers of Zeta Psi.

The Delta chapter at Marist College, established in October 1989, was the first sorority to be granted a charter at Marist College.

Philanthropy and service
Philanthropy: American Cancer Society
The sorority participates in Relay for Life each year and fundraises for the event.  In 2007, they were within the top ten fundraisers for Marist College.

Local Service Project: New York Blood Services
Every semester, Kappa Lambda Psi, joined with Alpha Phi Delta national fraternity, organizes an on-campus blood drive.  Kappa Lambda Psi received a plaque from New York Blood Services in appreciation for their contributions.

Campus involvement

Activities
Kappa Lambda Psi is one of the organizations responsible for bringing Take Back the Night to the college's campus.

Care Packages
Kappa Lambda Psi offers the purchasing of care packages (which consist of small snacks that come with a card), which are useful for students' parents to send in for comfort and best wishes during midterm weeks and as a fundraiser.

Awards
"Club of the Year" by Marist College's Student Government Association in 2001 and 2003. Kappa Lambda Psi is currently the only on-campus Greek organization to receive the award.
New York Blood Services gave Kappa Lambda Psi a plaque in appreciation of their work organizing Blood Drives at Marist College.

Chapters

 Α Chapter: Glassboro State College (now Rowan University) (Inactive)
 Β Chapter: Montclair State University (Inactive)
 Γ Chapter: Fairleigh Dickinson University (Inactive)
 Δ Chapter: Marist College
 Ε Chapter: William Paterson University (Inactive)

Notes

External links
 Kappa Lambda Psi 
 Marist College Relay for Life 2007
 Marist Scope article
 Marist Circle article 10/07/2004
 Marist Circle article 11/04/2004
 Marist Circle article 11/30/2006
 Marist Circle article 3/29/2007
 Marist Circle article 4/24/2007

https://www.marist.edu/student-life/community/conduct/greek/suspended-unrecognized-groups

Fraternities and sororities in the United States
Student organizations established in 1980
1980 establishments in New Jersey